The 2022 Southeast Missouri State Redhawks football team represented Southeast Missouri State University (SEMO) as a member of the Ohio Valley Conference (OVC) during the 2022 NCAA Division I FCS football season. Led by ninth-year head coach Tom Matukewicz, the Redhawks played their home games at Houck Stadium in Cape Girardeau, Missouri.

Although Southeast Missouri State finished as OVC co-champions with UT Martin (both with 5–0 OVC records), SEMO was awarded the automatic bid to the 2022 FCS playoffs while UT Martin was not. Both teams had identical records in conference play, and no game had been played between the two teams that season, as a result of schedule changes to accommodate new member Lindenwood. The tiebreaker to determine an automatic conference bid ultimately then came down to a coin flip, which the Redhawks won.

Previous season

The Redhawks finished the 2021 season with 4–7 overall record and 4–2 in conference record to finish in a tie for second place in OVC.

Schedule

Game summaries

at Iowa State

at No. 17 Southern Illinois

Nicholls

Central Arkansas

at Lindenwood

Tennessee Tech

at Northwestern State

Eastern Kentucky

at Tennessee State

at Eastern Illinois

Murray State

FCS Playoffs

at No. 19 Montana – First Round

References

Southeast Missouri State
Southeast Missouri State Redhawks football seasons
Ohio Valley Conference football champion seasons
Southeast Missouri State
Southeast Missouri State Redhawks football